Irene W. Griffin (November 10, 1927 - March 27, 2012) was an African-American activist, and the first black woman to register to vote in Plaquemines Parish, Louisiana. She was married to Rev. Percy Murphy Griffin, also a civil rights activist in that community.

Activism
Irene was married to Percy Murphy Griffin, and their initial efforts focused on taking on segregationist Judge Leander Perez after Percy returned from serving in World War II. They started a voter registration campaign for black community residents. In 1954, Irene became the first registered African-American woman to vote in Plaquemines Parish. In 1963, their home was bombed due to their activism. In 1966 after her husband Rev. Percy Murphy Griffin and his comrades organized a movement to integrate the Plaquemines Parish School system, Irene was right there on the battle field with him. Their mission on the Eastbank of Plaquemines Parish was to integrate the previous all white school, called Woodlawn. Nevertheless, they met opposite and protest from the whites who children attended the school. Unfortunately, some blacks jump the gun and took several black students to the school on the first day of opening. They met strong opposition from the white. Griffin and the remaining of the black students went to the school as scheduled on the 2nd day. Eventually the school was closed down. The Superintendent told Griffin to meet him at Phoenix High School on the following day. After he met with Griffin and other parents at Phoenix High, the superintendent informed them that they could send their kids to Belle Chasse High School on the westbank or leave them at Phoneix high. The scare tactics that the Superintendent used in his presentation, caused the parents of twenty-four black students to keep their children at Phoenix High. Mrs. Irene Griffin, under the guiding of her husband, allowed two of her sons to travel to Belle Chasse High School to partake in the movement.

Death
Irene Griffin died aged 84 in 2012.

Further reading
The life of Percy Murphy Griffin : the struggles and victories of a black civil rights activist from Plaquemines Parish

References

1927 births
2012 deaths
American suffragists
African-American activists
20th-century African-American people
21st-century African-American people
20th-century African-American women
21st-century African-American women